Chakraghatta is a rural municipality in Sarlahi District, a part of Province No. 2 in Nepal. It was formed in 2016 occupying current 9 sections (wards) from previous 9 former VDCs. It occupies an area of 25.16 km2 with a total population of 27,952.

References 

Populated places in Sarlahi District
Rural municipalities of Nepal established in 2017
Rural municipalities in Madhesh Province